Monarchist League may refer to:

British Commonwealth
 International Monarchist League (known until the mid-1990s as the Monarchist League), founded in 1943 and based in London, England, UK; supporting the monarchy
 Australian Monarchist League, founded in 1943 (affiliated with the IML until 1993); supporting the monarchy
 Monarchist League of Canada, founded in 1970 (unaffiliated with the IML); supporting the monarchy
 Monarchist League of New Zealand, founded in 1995 (unaffiliated with the IML); supporting the monarchy

Other
 Vietnamese Constitutional Monarchist League, founded in 1993, seeking the restoration of the House of Nguyen

See also

 List of monarchist movements by country
 Royal Stuart Society (aka the Royalist League), founded 1928; seeking restoration of the House of Stuart as the ruling house of Great Britain
 Monarchists
 Royalists